Ajda Novak (born 1993) is a Slovenian slalom canoeist who has competed at the international level since 2010.

She won two medals in the K1 team event at the ICF Canoe Slalom World Championships with a silver in 2022 and a bronze in 2013. She also won two medals (1 gold and 1 bronze) at the European Championships.

World Cup individual podiums

International Achievements

References

External links 

 Ajda NOVAK at CanoeSlalom.net
 

Slovenian female canoeists
Living people
1993 births
Canoeists at the 2010 Summer Youth Olympics
Medalists at the ICF Canoe Slalom World Championships
20th-century Slovenian women
21st-century Slovenian women